is a Japanese field hockey player. At the 2012 Summer Olympics she competed with the Japan women's national field hockey team in the women's tournament.

References

External links
 

Living people
1992 births
Field hockey players at the 2012 Summer Olympics
Olympic field hockey players of Japan
Japanese female field hockey players
Place of birth missing (living people)
Universiade medalists in field hockey
Universiade bronze medalists for Japan
Medalists at the 2013 Summer Universiade